Roger Roger is a BBC television comedy drama written by John Sullivan. The series was about a mini-cab firm called Cresta Cabs. The pilot aired in 1996 and there were three subsequent series on BBC1 in 1998–2003.

Cast and characters
Main characters

 Robert Daws as Sam: The owner of Cresta Cabs. He struggles to keep the company operational despite financial problems. His wife is in a nursing home with early-onset Alzheimer's and later dies. He had a brief affair with his married colleague Reen and still has feelings for her.
 Keith Allen as Dexter: Sam's business partner. He has a young wife Tina and a lavish lifestyle, which he supports by embezzling company funds. He apparently commits suicide in series 1, leaving Sam in financial trouble, but reappears in series 3, having faked his death.
 Pippa Guard as Reen: The office manager and dispatcher at Cresta Cabs. She is married to an alcoholic but is in love with Sam.
 David Ross as Baz: A postman who drives mini-cabs part-time. Baz goes on a series of unsuccessful first dates through a dating agency. He has a developmentally disabled stepson Marlon.
 Philip Glenister as Phil (played by Neil Morrissey in the pilot): A mini-cab driver and aspiring rock star with a girlfriend Chrissie and two children, Madonna and Cher.  In the second series, he is hired as a personal driver by a businessman who turns out to be a criminal. He does not appear in series 3.
 Helen Grace as Chrissie (played by Lesley Vickerage in the pilot): Phil's girlfriend who wants him to settle down and be realistic about his chances of becoming a rock star. She does not appear in series 3.
 Barbara Durkin as Tina: Dexter's flighty wife who makes advances on Sam after Dexter's death.
 Terence Maynard as Andre: A mini-cab driver and ladies' man who has several children with different women. He does not appear in series 3.
 Paul Sharma as Rajiv: A mini-cab driver and accountant who later becomes Sam's business partner.
 Jude Akuwudike as Henry: A mini-cab driver notorious for getting lost.
 Ricci Harnett as Marlon: Baz's developmentally disabled stepson.
 Chris Larkin as Cambridge: A mini-cab driver who went to university. He does not appear in series 3.
 John Thomson (series 1) and Jonathan Moore (series 2–3) as Barry: A mini-cab driver.

Recurring and other characters

 Barry Foster as Pieter Eugene: A shady businessman who employs Phil in series 2.
 Kirstie Kober as Madonna: Daughter of Phil and Chrissie.
 Lauren Ashby as Cher: Daughter of Phil and Chrissie.
 Joan Hodges as Marilyn: The night-shift dispatcher at Cresta Cabs.
 Robert Glenister as Dr. Geoff: Sam's therapist in series 3.
 Beth Goddard as Melanie: One of Baz's dates who turns out to have a child with Andre. (Series 1, Episode 5)
 Sam Spiegel as Monsieur Pierre
 Anthony Head as Jimmy Price: A rock star whose wife makes advances on Phil. (Pilot)
 Sally Dexter as Maddie Price: The wife of rock star Jimmy Price. (Pilot)
 Ross O'Hennessy as Policeman

Episodes

Pilot: 1996
The pilot was a 60-minute episode that aired 26 April 1996 on BBC1.

Series 1: 1998
The first series had six 50-minute episodes, airing from 8 January to 12 February 1998 on BBC1. The storyline involves the apparent suicide of Sam's business partner Dexter and Sam's discovery that Dexter embezzled from the company.

Series 2: 1999
The second series had seven 50-minute episodes that aired from 25 September to 6 November 1999 on BBC1. In this series, Sam attempts to recover from the financial problems caused by Dexter and to ward off the advances of Dexter's wife Tina. A secondary storyline involves Phil becoming a driver for a businessman who turns out to be a criminal.

Series 3: 2003
The third series had three 60 minute episodes that aired from 27 July to 10 August 2003 on BBC1. The story deals with Dexter's return from abroad after faking his death in series 1.

Cast and characters
Main characters

 Robert Daws as Sam: The owner of Cresta Cabs. He struggles to keep the company operational despite financial problems. His wife is in a nursing home with early-onset Alzheimer's and later dies. He had a brief affair with his married colleague Reen and still has feelings for her.
 Keith Allen as Dexter: Sam's business partner. He has a young wife Tina and a lavish lifestyle, which he supports by embezzling company funds. He apparently commits suicide in series 1, leaving Sam in financial trouble, but reappears in series 3, having faked his death.
 Pippa Guard as Reen: The office manager and dispatcher at Cresta Cabs. She is married to an alcoholic but is in love with Sam.
 David Ross as Baz: A postman who drives mini-cabs part-time. Baz goes on a series of unsuccessful first dates through a dating agency. He has a developmentally disabled stepson Marlon.
 Philip Glenister as Phil (played by Neil Morrissey in the pilot): A mini-cab driver and aspiring rock star with a girlfriend Chrissie and two children, Madonna and Cher.  In the second series, he is hired as a personal driver by a businessman who turns out to be a criminal. He does not appear in series 3.
 Helen Grace as Chrissie (played by Lesley Vickerage in the pilot): Phil's girlfriend who wants him to settle down and be realistic about his chances of becoming a rock star. She does not appear in series 3.
 Barbara Durkin as Tina: Dexter's flighty wife who makes advances on Sam after Dexter's death.
 Terence Maynard as Andre: A mini-cab driver and ladies' man who has several children with different women. He does not appear in series 3.
 Paul Sharma as Rajiv: A mini-cab driver and accountant who later becomes Sam's business partner.
 Jude Akuwidike as Henry: A mini-cab driver notorious for getting lost.
 Ricci Harnett as Marlon: Baz's developmentally disabled stepson.
 Chris Larkin as Cambridge: A mini-cab driver who went to university. He does not appear in series 3.
 John Thomson (series 1) and Jonathan Moore (series 2–3) as Barry: A mini-cab driver.

Recurring and other characters

 Barry Foster as Pieter Eugene: A shady businessman who employs Phil in series 2.
 Kirstie Kober as Madonna: Daughter of Phil and Chrissie.
 Lauren Ashby as Cher: Daughter of Phil and Chrissie.
 Joan Hodges as Marilyn: The night-shift dispatcher at Cresta Cabs.
 Robert Glenister as Dr. Geoff: Sam's therapist in series 3.
 Beth Goddard as Melanie: One of Baz's dates who turns out to have a child with Andre. (Series 1, Episode 5)
 Sam Spiegel as Monsieur Pierre
 Anthony Head as Jimmy Price: A rock star whose wife makes advances on Phil. (Pilot)
 Sally Dexter as Maddie Price: The wife of rock star Jimmy Price. (Pilot)
 Ross O'Hennessy as Policeman

External links

Roger Roger at the BFI Film and TV Database

1996 British television series debuts
2003 British television series endings
1990s British comedy-drama television series
2000s British comedy-drama television series
BBC television dramas
Television series produced at Pinewood Studios
English-language television shows